Printed Rainbow is a 2006 Indian animated short film directed, animated and produced by Gitanjali Rao. It was first screened in International Critic's Week 2006 film festival held in Cannes, France.

Plot
A lonely old phillumenist woman lives in a little flat and uses her collection of matchboxes covers to dream away to more adventurous and fantastical worlds.

Music
Background score for the film is composed by Rajivan Ayappan. It also features one folk song Na Ja Balam Pardes sung by Begum Akhtar.

Awards
Three awards as best short film at the Cannes International Critic's Week 2006 festival including:
Kodak Short Film Award
Critic's Award

References

External links

2006 animated films
2006 films
Indian animated films
Films about death
Indian short films
Indian animated short films
2000s animated short films
2006 short films